"Stranac u noći" ("Stranger In The Night) is the B-side of the third single by the Serbian band Idoli. The song is a piano-dominated ballad for which Vlada Divljan provided the lead vocals.

Track listing 

 "Bambina" (3:08) (N. Krstić, S. Šaper, V. Divljan, D. Gerzić)
 "Stranac u noći" (4:31) (N. Krstić, S. Šaper, V. Divljan)

Personnel 

 Vlada Divljan (guitar, lead vocals)
 Nebojša Krstić (percussion, vocals)
 Srđan Šaper (synthesizer, vocals)
 Branko Isaković (bass guitar)
 Kokan Popović (drums)

External links 
 Bambina / Stranac U Noći at Discogs

1983 singles
Idoli songs
Songs written by Vlada Divljan
1983 songs
Jugoton singles